Mattaangassut Island (old spelling: Mátângassut) is an uninhabited island in Avannaata municipality in northwestern Greenland.

Geography 
Mattaangassut Island is located in Tasiusaq Bay, in the north-central part of Upernavik Archipelago. It is separated from Nutaarmiut Island in the southeast by a narrow Ikerasakassak strait, and from Qallunaat Island in the east by the waterways of Tasiusaq Bay.

References 

Uninhabited islands of Greenland
Tasiusaq Bay
Islands of the Upernavik Archipelago